Balashankar Ullasram Kantharia (May 17, 1858 – April 1, 1898), was a Gujarati poet.

Biography
Balashankar Kantharia was born on May 17, 1858 into a Sathodara Nagar Brahmin family in Nadiad (now in Gujarat, India). He was born to Ullasram Arjunlal Kantharia, a government magistrate, and Revaba, and had one brother, Umedram, and one sister, Rukshmani. Balashankar had studied till the first year of his college. He was a polyglot and knew Gujarati, Persian, Arabic, Sanskrit, Braj and Hindi languages as well as music and archaeology. His wife's name was Manilakshmi.

He briefly worked in government service. He managed Bharati Bhusan, Itihas Mala, Krishna Mahoday magazines. He served as an editor of Buddhiprakash magazine briefly. He is considered as the founder of the modern Gujarati poetry and Ghazal. Manilal Dwivedi was his close friend. He considered himself as a follower of Dalpatram and was expert in poetry in Shikharini metre. It is believed that Kalapi had learned Ghazal poetry from him and Manilal Dwivedi.

He died due to the plague, on April 1, 1898 at Baroda (now Vadodara, Gujarat).

Works 

Kalant Kavi and Bal were his pen names. He is credited with bringing Persian style poetry such as Ghazal in Gujarati literature. Kalant Kavi and Hariprem Panchdashi are his collections of poetry. He had translated Karpūramañjarī by Rajasekhara, Mṛcchakatika and Sufi Ghazals of Hafez in Gujarati.

"Gujare Je Shire Tare" is his popular ghazal poetry composed in Bah’r Hazaj Saalim metre.

References

Further reading

External links 
 
 

Gujarati-language writers
1898 deaths
1858 births
People from Kheda district
Gujarati-language poets
Indian magazine editors